In Pieces may refer to:

Music 
 In Pieces (Garth Brooks album), 1993
 In Pieces (Chlöe album), 2023
 "In Pieces" (song), 2007, by Shannon Noll

Media 
 In Pieces (film), a 2010 Moroccan documentary
 In Pieces (memoir), 2018 autobiography of actress Sally Field

See also 
 Piece (disambiguation)
 Breakdown (disambiguation)
 Breakup, in relationships
 Break Up (disambiguation)
 Deconstruction (disambiguation)